The Jekyll and Hyde Portfolio is a 1971 American sexploitation slasher film produced and directed by Eric Jeffrey Haims. Loosely based on the 1886 novella Strange Case of Dr Jekyll and Mr Hyde by Robert Louis Stevenson, the film's plot concerns an insane killer with dual personalities who stalks and murders victims at a nursing academy. It stars Sebastian Brook, Mady Maguire, Donn Greer, Gray Daniels, John Terry, and Rene Bond.

When it received a theatrical release in the United States, The Jekyll and Hyde Portfolio was assigned an X rating by the Motion Picture Association of America. The film was later released on VHS in the United Kingdom, and this release is now considered to be a valuable collector's item. In 2014, the film was released on DVD and Blu-ray by Vinegar Syndrome.

Cast
 Sebastian Brook as Dr. Dorian Cabala (as Sebastian Brooks)
 Mady Maguire as Dr. Leticia Boges
 Donn Greer as Detective John Kinkaid
 Gray Daniels as Sgt. Martin Wolf
 John Terry as Dr. Mark Carter
 Rene Bond as June Gemini

Critical reception
In his book The Gorehound's Guide to Splatter Films of the 1960s and 1970s, author Scott Aaron Stine gave the film a negative review, writing: "The acting is god-awful, [...] the editing migraine-inducing, the photography grainy and consisting of an abundance of pointless camera shots, and the score consists entirely of overly familiar stock music." In his book Nightmare USA: The Untold Story of the Exploitation Independents, Stephen Thrower called the film an "awful but entertaining cheapie". Brian Orndorf of Blu-ray.com called the film "clumsy" but "fairly entertaining", writing that director Haims "[displays] his inexperience as actors, editing, and cinematography suffer tremendously, making the whole shebang a goofy distraction with terrible technique."

Home media
In the 1980s, The Jekyll and Hyde Portfolio was released on VHS by British home media distributor Intervision Video. This release has been called "one of the world's rarest" video releases, and is reportedly worth up to £1,000 as a collector's item. In April 2014, the film was restored and released on DVD and Blu-ray by Vinegar Syndrome as a double feature with the 1972 film A Clock Work Blue, also directed by Haims.

References

Bibliography

External links
 

1970s exploitation films
1971 horror films
1971 films
1970s slasher films
Dr. Jekyll and Mr. Hyde films
American sexploitation films
American slasher films
1970s English-language films
1970s American films